Stoke railway station may refer to:

 Stoke railway station, New Zealand, a former station in Stoke, south of Nelson
 Stoke railway station (Suffolk), a former station in Stoke-by-Clare, England
 Stoke-on-Trent railway station, a mainline railway station serving the city of Stoke-on-Trent, England